The Sting-rays (often credited The Stingrays) were a British rock band from Greater London which recorded on Ace Records' garage and psychedelic subsidiary Big Beat and Joe Foster's Kaleidoscope Sound in the 1980s.

Discography
Most of the band's songs were written by Alec Palao and Bal Croce
Albums
Dinosaurs (Big Beat, 1983)
Cryptic and Coffee Time (Kaleidoscope Sound, 1987)
The Essential (Early) Sting-Rays  (Big Beat, 1987)
From the Kitchen Sink (Big Beat, 2002) compilation

EP's, Singles
 On Self Destruct (Big Beat, 1983) EP
The Crusher as Bananamen (Big Beat, 1983) EP
"Escalator" (Big Beat, 1984)
"Don't Break Down" (Big Beat, 1985)	
June Rhyme (Kaleidoscope Sound, 1986) EP
Behind the Beyond (Kaleidoscope Sound, 1986) EP

Live
Stomping at the Klub Foot (1984) (with Restless, Milkshakes and Guana Batz)
Live Retaliation (Media Burn, 1985)
Live & Raw  (Raucous, 1995)
Live at the Klub Foot 1984 (Cherry Red, 2010)

Compilation contributions
Blood on the Cats (Anagram, 1983)
Revenge of the Killer Pussies (Blood on the Cats #2) (Anagram, 1984)
Children of Nuggets: Original Artyfacts from the Second Psychedelic Era, 1976–1995 (1995)

References

External links
http://www.forcedexposure.com/Artists/STING.RAYS.THE.html
Getty Images: Group photo

English rock music groups
Garage punk groups
British psychobilly musical groups
Musical groups established in 1981
Musical groups from London
Cherry Red Records artists